Jeanne Altmann, born March 18, 1940, in New York City,  is a professor emerita and Eugene Higgins Professor of ecology and evolutionary biology currently at Princeton University. She is known for her research on the social behaviour of baboons and her contributions to contemporary primate behavioural ecology. She is a founder and co-director of the Amboseli Baboon Research Project. Her paper in 1974 on the observational study of behaviour is a cornerstone for ecologists and has been cited more than 10,000 times. She is a Fellow of the National Academy of Sciences, and a member of the American Philosophical Society (2020)

Early life and education
Jeanne Altmann started her undergraduate degree at UCLA as a mathematics major. However, during her second year, she transferred to MIT after marrying Stuart Altmann, who was a graduate student at Harvard. She then accompanied him to the University of Alberta, where she received her degree in mathematics in 1962. Altmann then attended Emory University for her M.A.T. in mathematics and teaching, which she earned in 1970. Later, she started her graduate degree in biology at the University of Chicago. Through her dissertation, she decided to focus on social and familial interactions of baboons.

Using her mathematics background, she was employed as a data analyst in a lab studying human childhood. It was with her background in mathematics that her best known paper was written in 1974 which had been cited at least 10,000 times as of March 1, 2014.

Career and research
After graduating from the University of Alberta, Altmann began work as a primate researcher at the university; she stayed in this position until 1965. While at Emory, she researched at the Yerkes National Primate Research Center, then moved to the University of Chicago for her doctoral studies and the bulk of her career. She became an associate professor there in 1985 and was promoted to full professor in 1989. She also curated the primate exhibits at the Brookfield Zoo in the Chicago suburbs. In 1998, Altmann moved to Princeton University, where she remains a professor emerita. From 2003–2008, she was a visiting professor of animal physiology at the University of Nairobi, and has been an honorary zoology lecturer there since 1989.

Altmann is known for her involvement with the creation and development of the Amboseli Baboon Research Project, which counts its official start in 1971, following a preliminary field study in 1963-4. She was awarded the Sewall Wright Award in 2013 and the Lifetime Achievement Award from the International Primatological Society in 2014. In her area of study, Altmann's fieldwork employs observational rather than experimental sampling methods. This allows her to follow the behaviour of baboons in their natural environment. She utilizes mainly non-invasive techniques. The ABRP also collects fecal samples for genetic, hormonal, and intestinal bacterial analyses.

Altmann's research specifically looks at the behavioural ecology of baboons that range in and near Amboseli National Park, Kenya. With collaborators Susan Alberts, Elizabeth Archie, and Jenny Tung, Altmann's research interests have included demography, the mother-infant relationship, behavioral ecology and endocrinology, the evolution of social behavior, aging, sexual selection, disease ecology, and functional genomics. She was one of the first researchers to study primate mothers, and studies the effects of genes on parenting and mating.

Honors and awards 
 1988 - Fellow, American Association of Zoological Parks and Aquariums
 1989 - Fellow, Animal Behavior Society
 1996 - Exemplar Award, Animal Behavior Society
 1996 - Fellow, American Academy of Arts and Sciences
 2003 - Fellow, National Academy of Sciences
 2013 - Sewall Wright Award
 2014 - Lifetime Achievement Award, International Primatological Society
 2020 - Member, American Philosophical Society
 2022 - BBVA Foundation Frontiers of Knowledge Award

Bibliography

References

Evolutionary biologists
Women evolutionary biologists
Living people
Princeton University faculty
Women primatologists
Primatologists
20th-century American women scientists
20th-century American biologists
21st-century American women scientists
21st-century American biologists
1940 births
Members of the American Philosophical Society
Members of the United States National Academy of Sciences
20th-century American zoologists
21st-century American zoologists
American mammalogists
Fellows of the American Academy of Arts and Sciences